Karabakh Shikastasi — is one of the rhythmic Azerbaijani mughams. It is a macama-based segah. Musical size - 2/4. It is performed at a heavy pace. After each verse sung by the singer, a different melody (instrumental episode) is played. It is considered one of the most popular shikeste - lyrical extended songs.

"Karabakh Shikeste" was used in the opera"Asli and Kerem" of Uzeyir Hajibeyov, "Shah Ismail" of Muslim Magomayev,"Shahsenem" of Reingold Glier. The melody of this mugham is played in the 28 May metro station in Baku.

It is believed that "Karabakh shikestesi" was performed with special brilliance by the Peoples Artist of the Azerbaijan SSR Khan Shushinsky.

See also 
 Mugham
 Mugham triads
 Music of Azerbaijan

References

External links 
 Karabakh Shikastasi - Performed by Arif Babayev
 "Karabakh Shikastasi"  performed by Khan Shushinski, Shovkat Alakbarova and Sara Gadimova 
 "Kharibulbul" festival: "Karabakh Shikastasi" performed by Alim Gasimov and Fargana Gasimova

Azerbaijani music
Modes (music)
Mugham modes